Veselin Đoković (also transliterated Veselin Djoković; born 18 February 1976) is a Serbian/Montenegrin retired footballer. Despite having been born in Serbia, he is often regarded as Montenegrin because of his family roots.

Playing career
He started his football career in local side FK Sloga Požega before moving to FK Bečej who was playing back then in the First League of FR Yugoslavia.

Next in 1998 he went to AS Marsa, to Tunis but in 1999 he returned to Serbia signing with FK Mladost Lučani playing in the Second League of FR Yugoslavia.

His first Polish club was Pogoń Szczecin, where he played in 2000, playing 17 matches and scoring one goal. Fall season 2001–02 he went to Amica Wronki, where he played in 44 matches and scored one goal.

From the start of the season 2004–05 he played for Legia Warsaw, where he played in 13 matches and scored one goal that season.

Managerial career
He was a manager of FK Sloga Požega. After termination he became a manager of one local soccer club near village Rasna.

External links
 
 
 

1976 births
Living people
People from Požega, Serbia
Serbian people of Montenegrin descent
Association football central defenders
Serbia and Montenegro footballers
Serbian footballers
FK Sloga Požega players
OFK Bečej 1918 players
AS Marsa players
FK Mladost Lučani players
Pogoń Szczecin players
Amica Wronki players
Legia Warsaw players
Korona Kielce players
First League of Serbia and Montenegro players
Tunisian Ligue Professionnelle 1 players
Second League of Serbia and Montenegro players
Ekstraklasa players
Serbia and Montenegro expatriate footballers
Expatriate footballers in Poland
Serbia and Montenegro expatriate sportspeople in Poland
Expatriate footballers in Tunisia
Serbian expatriate footballers
Serbian expatriate sportspeople in Poland
Serbian football managers